A kalari is a traditional training space for kalaripayattu, a martial art of Kerala.

Kalari may also refer to:

Kalari, an alternate name for Kalantaka, an aspect of the Hindu god Shiva
Kalari cheese, an Indian cheese
Kalari (film), a 2018 Tamil film
Kalari, Burkina Faso, a village in Burkina Faso
Kalari, Iran, a village in Jask County, Hormozgan Province, Iran

People with the surname
Renaldo Kalari (born 1984), Albanian footballer